Unions ACT is a representative body of trade union organisations in the Australian Capital Territory (ACT), with 24 affiliated unions representing over 33,000 union members. The current secretary is Matthew Harrison. The previous secretary was Alex White (2014 to 2020), who sat on the Board of Directors of Greenpeace Australia-Pacific and the Wilderness Society.

See also

 Australian Council of Trade Unions
 Unions NSW
Victorian Trades Hall Council

References

External links 

 

Trade unions in Australia
Organisations based in Canberra